Massapequa (YTB-807) was a United States Navy  named for Massapequa, New York.

Construction
The contract for Massapequa was awarded 4 March 1969. She was laid down on 30 October 1969 at
Sturgeon Bay, Wisconsin, by Peterson Builders and launched 27 May 1970.

Operational history
Delivered 30 November 1970, Massapequa served at Naval Station Yokosuka, Japan.

Stricken from the Navy List 27 September 2011.  Naval Vessel Register lists ex-Massapequa as 'Stricken, to be disposed of by Navy sale'.  Another source suggests that she sank en route to the  Marshall Islands.

References

External links
 

 

Natick-class large harbor tugs
1970 ships
Ships built by Peterson Builders